Broken Star may refer to:

 Broken Star (album), 1998 album by American punk band The Broadways
 Broken Star (film), 2018 American psychological thriller film
 The Broken Star, 1956 American Western film